The First Kubilius Cabinet was the 10th cabinet of Lithuania since 1990. It consisted of the Prime Minister and 14 government ministers.

History 

Andrius Kubilius of the Homeland Union was appointed the Prime Minister by President Valdas Adamkus on 3 November 1999. Kubilius was the third Prime Minister delegated by the ruling Homeland Union during the term of the Seventh Seimas, after Rolandas Paksas resigned amidst disagreements over privatization, causing his government to collapse.

Only 2 ministers and the Prime Minister changed from previous cabinet (latter in was joined by Minister of Government Reforms and Municipalities). The government received its mandate and started its work on 11 November 1999, after the Seimas gave assent to its program.

By spring of 2000, Moderates' parliamentary group, which will create Union of Moderate Conservatives, was formed and dissenting members of the Homeland Union (including former Prime Minister Gediminas Vagnorius) joined its ranks. Due to this, government lost majority in Seimas.

The government served until the end of the term of the Seimas, returning its mandate on 19 October 2000, following the elections to Seimas. The government continued to serve in an acting capacity, until the new government formed by Paksas (now leading Liberal Union of Lithuania) started its work on 9 November 2000.

Cabinet
The following ministers served on the First Kubilius Cabinet.

References 

Cabinet of Lithuania
1999 establishments in Lithuania
2000 disestablishments in Lithuania
Cabinets established in 1999
Cabinets disestablished in 2000